This is a list of episodes of the British version of the Cluedo TV series.

Series

Series 1
This first series, hosted by James Bellini, set had a blue and white theme with the suspects having to walk down ramp and steps to arrive at their seats with the teams sitting in a high rise area with white triangular desks. In this series, each team is made up of one celebrity and an expert in a field linked to the murder in some way. As well as the Christmas special, there are 300 members of the studio audience to which some are seen in the background risers behind the teams and the suspects and vote halfway during the show to see whom they think the killer was. This is the only series where Rev. Green was the only suspect not to be the killer in any of the episodes while Mrs. Peacock was the killer twice. But this is also the only series where the poison is used as the murder weapon twice and a choice of the murder weapons in all of the episodes. This is also the only series where the dining room is the murder room in some of the episodes. In episodes, suspects' reasons for murder are not present or relevant.

This is the only series where Mrs. White's husband, Mr. White is seen. From the next series onwards, Mrs. White is a widow. Mr. White was never a suspect and he lived with Mrs. White in an annex building next to where Mrs. White worked. He is also only seen with Mrs. White. In such scenes, they called each other "Mr. White" and "Mrs. White", respectively. As a result, Mr. White's first name is never revealed.

Christmas Special
This special was an extended edition to 45 minutes with extra evidence. The set was painted from blue to red and the teams' white desks changed to cream and there was a new cream perimeter around the suspects' seating area plus the six weapons used are the actual ones traditionally used in Cluedo. As well, the usual billiard room is replaced with the hall. Both team members were celebrities, one of whom was Leslie Grantham who would go on to portray Colonel Mustard in Series 4.

Series 2
This series brought a new host in Chris Tarrant and a new smaller set with a new brown and orange theme with each weapon on an individual plinth at the front of the set and a map of the grange in the background. This is the first series that all guests are killers in one season. Lewis Collins, who would play Colonel Mustard in Series 3, makes an appearance in episode 6 as the murder victim (and Mrs. Peacock's supposedly dead husband) Jack Peacock.

'''

Series 3
Richard Madeley takes over as host for this and the next series, and with him came a new set which had a silver and blue theme. Not much change was seen but mainly made for fake marble. There were no weapons presented in front of the teams for the first time and at the end of each episode, viewers got a chance to answer a question about that episode's murder to win a murder mystery weekend.

Notably, one of the guests in episode 3 is Nicholas Parsons who would go on to portray Rev. Green in the next series.

Series 4
Richard Madeley introduced each episode from Arlington Grange, showing the possible weapons to the viewers. Once in the studio, viewers were given the option to see the murder solution before the questioning began, or to look away while the solution was shown so they could play along at home.

References 

1990 British television seasons
1991 British television seasons
1992 British television seasons
1993 British television seasons
Cluedo